St. Stephen's Episcopal Church is a historic parish of the Episcopal Diocese of Pennsylvania, founded in 1823 in Philadelphia, Pennsylvania and located at 19 South Tenth Street, on the corner of Tenth Street and Ludlow Street. St. Stephen's was designed by William Strickland in the Gothic revival style. It is the oldest extant building in Philadelphia in this style and was designed by an architect-engineer best known for Greek Revival buildings, though, like his mentor Benjamin Latrobe, he produced buildings in other "picturesque" styles as well. St. Stephen's first service was held on February 27, 1823. On June 4, 1979, it was added to the National Register of Historic Places. On May 28, 1957, it was designated a historic landmark by the Philadelphia Historical Commission.

History

Called "bold" in its time, St. Stephen's is an example of Philadelphia's earliest Gothic Revival buildings that responded to the great local demand for this type since the 1780s. Long considered "misunderstood" Gothic, this early or "Georgian" Gothic, popular in 18th-century Britain, recalls the architecture of Protestant Tudor England (1485–1603) rather than the high Gothic of the Pre-Reformation 12th century that inspired the familiar Gothic Revival from the 1830s on. Architect Frank Furness added a transept and vestry room in 1878.

A plaque on the outside front wall, apparently unrelated to the oval Philadelphia Historical Commission marker above it, reads: "THIS CHURCH IS BUILT ON THE SITE WHERE BENJ. FRANKLIN FLEW HIS FAMOUS KITE," though the history of the marker is unclear, and apparently unrelated to the oval Philadelphia Historical Commission marker above it.

Artwork 
The sanctuary contains a great deal of artwork from throughout the church's history. Sculptor Carl Johann Steinhauser was commissioned to create two sculptures for the church: the "Angel of the Resurrection" (also known as the Burd Children's Memorial, for three of the children of Edward Shippen Burd and Eliza Howard Sims Burd) in 1852 and the Burd Baptismal font, completed in 1857. Architect Richard Upjohn designed a side chapel (1849–1853) to house the Burd Children's Monument. Other artwork includes the Burd Canopy Tomb (c. 1860), designed by architect Frank Wills and sculpted by Henry Kirke Brown; various memorials to former rectors; and, until it was purchased by the Philadelphia Museum of Art in 2004, the sculpture The Angel of Purity by Augustus Saint-Gaudens.

The sanctuary features stained glass windows created by D'Ascenzo Studios as well as Louis Comfort Tiffany of Tiffany Studios. Architect Henry Holiday designed two of the stained glass windows in the sanctuary in addition to the Venetian glass mosaic of The Last Supper (1887–1889) above the altar.

Rectors 
In the Episcopal Church in the United States of America, the rector is the priest elected to head a self-supporting parish.
 The Rev. Dr. James Montgomery (1823–1834)
 The Rev. Dr. H. W. Ducachet (1834–1865)
 The Rev. Dr. William Rudder (1865–1880)
 The Rev. Dr. Samuel D. McConnell (1882–1896)
 The Rev. Dr. Elwood Worcester (1896–1904)
 The Rev. Dr. Carl E. Grammer (1905–1936)
 The Rev. Dr. Vincent C. Franks (1937–1939)
 The Rev. Dr. Alfred W. Price (1942–)
 The Rev. Roy Hendricks (1971–1983)
 The Rev. Patricia A. Oglesby, interim (1983–1985)
 The Rev. Robert A. Schiesler (1985–1990)
 The Rev. Charles T. Flood Priest-in-Charge and then rector (1990–2016)
 The Rev. Peter Kountz, PhD, Vicar (2016–2019) and then Priest-in-Residence (2019–present) 
 The Rev. Michael Giansiracusa, Vicar (2019–present)

See also

St. Peter's Church, Philadelphia
Saint Mary's Church, Hamilton Village
Lantern Theater Company

References
Notes

External links

St. Stephen's Church Philadelphia
St. Stephen Church
St. Stephen's Protestant Episcopal Church
National Register listing for St. Stephen's
Pennsylvania Historical and Museum Commission
Philadelphia Historical Commission
The Immortals of St. Stephen's Church, Philadelphia: A Paper Read at the Parish's 125th Anniversary Dinner (1948)
Reports and Financial Statements Rendered at the Annual Parish Meeting of St. Stephen's Church, Philadelphia (1937-1953)
Address of Roland S. Morris Delivered at the Centennial Anniversary of St. Stephen's Church, Philadelphia (1923)
Service Leaflet for the Presentation of Recent Improvements by Ms. Anne Magee on the 100th Anniversary of the Consecration of St. Stephen's Church, Philadelphia (1923)
Service Leaflet for the Presentation of Alternations and Decorations by Ms. Anne Magee at St. Stephen's Church, Philadelphia (1918)
The Rich Heritage of 125 Years of Christian Service: St. Stephen's Church in the City of Philadelphia (1948)

Churches completed in 1823
19th-century Episcopal church buildings
Churches in Philadelphia
Episcopal churches in Pennsylvania
Properties of religious function on the National Register of Historic Places in Philadelphia
Frank Furness buildings
Gothic Revival church buildings in Pennsylvania
Market East, Philadelphia
Churches on the National Register of Historic Places in Pennsylvania